Aquitania may refer to:
 Gallia Aquitania, a region of Gaul inhabited by the Aquitani, a people living in Gallo-Roman times in what is now Aquitaine, France
 Aquitaine, a region of France roughly between the Pyrenees, the Atlantic Ocean and the Garonne, also a former kingdom and duchy
 387 Aquitania, a fairly large main belt asteroid
 Aquitania, Boyacá, Colombia
 RMS Aquitania, a Cunard Line ocean liner
 The Aquitania, a luxury, cooperative apartment in Chicago, Illinois
 British Rail Class 40 diesel locomotive D215, built by English Electric at Newton-le-Willows, Lancashire

See also
 Aquitaine (disambiguation)
 Via Aquitania